The New Zealand Electricity Authority is an independent Crown entity responsible for the regulation of the New Zealand electricity market. The Authority was established in November 2010, following a government review of the electricity industry, and replaced the Electricity Commission. The Authority has a narrower focus on industry competition, reliability and efficiency than the Electricity Commission had.

The key functions performed by the Authority are:
 Registering industry participants
 Developing and administering the Electricity Industry Participation Code
 Monitoring and enforcing compliance with the Code
 Acting as Market Administrator and contracting providers of market operations services
 Facilitating market performance through information, best-practice guidelines and related services; and
 Undertaking sector reviews

Functions that were performed by the Commission, but which are undertaken by agencies other than the Authority include:
 Consumer protection – Consumer Affairs at Ministry of Business, Innovation and Employment
 Electricity efficiency – Energy Efficiency and Conservation Authority
 Reserve energy and emergency campaigns – Transpower
 Security of supply information and forecasting – Transpower
 Transmission network upgrades approval – Commerce Commission

See also
 Electricity sector in New Zealand
 Electricity Commission (New Zealand)

References

External links
 Electricity Authority

New Zealand Crown agents
Electric power in New Zealand
2010 establishments in New Zealand
Electricity authorities